Three Upbuilding Discourses (1843) is a book by Danish philosopher Søren Kierkegaard. Kierkegaard continues his discussion of the difference between externalities and inwardness in the Discourses, but now he moves from the inwardness of faith to that of love. Everything is always changing in the external world but in the inner spiritual world there is one thing that never changes according to Kierkegaard. He says, “What is it that never changes even though everything is changed? It is love, and that alone is love, that which never becomes something else.” Love is dependent on how a person sees  and when the individual sees with love that individual can see away sin in himself as well as the sin of the whole world, just as Christ did.

However, for one to be able to do this one must be “strengthened in the inner being.”  When the inner being “announces itself it craves an explanation, a witness that explains the meaning of everything for it, and its own meaning by explaining it in the God who holds everything together in his eternal wisdom and who assigned to man to be lord of creation by his becoming God’s servant, and explained himself to him by making him his co-worker, and through every explanation that he gives a person, he strengthens and confirms him in his inner being." In this concern the inner being announces itself-the inner being that is concerned not about the whole world but only about God and about itself, about the explanation that makes the relation understandable to it, and about the witness that confirms it in the relation.”

Structure 
The dedication: To the late Michael Pedersen Kierkegaard, formerly a clothing merchant here in the city, My Father, these discourses are dedicated.
The Preface: dedicated “to that single individual whom I with joy and gratitude call my reader …”
The Three Discourses: 
Love Will Hide a Multitude of Sins,
Love Will Hide a Multitude of Sins,
Strengthening in the Inner Being

The Biblical text for the discourse or discourses
He has two discourses with the same title in Three Upbuilding Discourses. When he wrote Four Upbuilding Discourses, he went back and wrote two discourses titled, Every Good Gift And Every Perfect Gift Is From Above, which was one of his discourse titles from the earlier Two Upbuilding Discourses.  Kierkegaard goes forward in the repetition of each discourse and adds a little more thought to the preceding discourse.

Love Will Hide a Multitude of Sins 
1 Peter 4:7-12, The Holy Bible NIV
"The end of all things is near. Therefore be clear minded and self-controlled so that you can pray. Above all, love each other deeply, because love covers over a multitude of sins. Offer hospitality to one another without grumbling. Each one should use whatever gift he has received to serve others, faithfully administering God's grace in its various forms. If anyone speaks, he should do it as one speaking the very words of God. If anyone serves, he should do it with the strength God provides, so that in all things God may be praised through Jesus Christ. To him be the glory and the power for ever and ever. Amen. Dear friends, do not be surprised at the painful trial you are suffering, as though something strange were happening to you."

Kierkegaard's thesis is that love never becomes something else because of external circumstances. He discusses “how love hides a multitude of sins”  and that “does not depend merely upon what one sees, but what one sees depends upon how one sees; all observation is not just a receiving, a discovering, but also a bringing forth, and insofar as it is that, how the observer himself is constituted is indeed decisive. When one person sees one thing and another sees something else in the same thing, then the one discovers what the other conceals. Insofar as the object viewed belongs to the external world, then how the observer is constituted is probably less important, or, more correctly then what is necessary for the observation is something irrelevant to his deeper nature. But the more the object of observation belongs to the world of the spirit, the more important is the way he himself is constituted in his innermost nature, because everything spiritual is appropriated only in freedom; but what is appropriated in freedom is also brought forth. The difference, then, is not the external but the internal, and everything that makes a person impure and his observation impure comes from within.”  The heart “determines what he hides and what he covers.”

Kierkegaard further explains this whole concept in Works of Love, The one who loves sees the sin he forgives, but he believes that forgiveness takes it away. This cannot be seen, whereas the sin can indeed be seen; on the other hand, if the sin did not exist to be seen, it could not be forgiven either. Just as one by faith believes the unseen into what is seen, so the one who loves by forgiveness believes away what is seen. Both are faith. Blessed is the believer, he believes what he cannot see; blessed is the one who loves, he believes away that which he indeed can see! Who can believe this? The one who loves can do it. But why is forgiveness so rare? Is it not because faith in the power of forgiveness is so meager and so rare? … When love forgives the miracle of faith happens (and every miracle is then a miracle of faith-no wonder, therefore, that along with faith miracles have also been abolished!): that what is seen is, by being forgiven, not seen. It is blotted out, it is forgiven and forgotten, or, as Scripture says, of what God forgives, it is hidden behind his back. Works of Love, Chapter V, Love Hides a Multitude of Sins, Hong p. 295

Kierkegaard asks, What is in your heart? He says, “When evil lives in the heart, the eye sees offense, but when purity lives in the heart, the eye sees the finger of God.” (...) “When fear lives in the heart, a person easily discovers the multiplicity of sin, discovers deceit and delusion and disloyalty and scheming, discovers that; Every heart is a net, Every rogue like a child, Every promise like a shadow. But the love that hides a multitude of sins is never deceived”. “When love lives in the heart, a person understands slowly and does not hear at all words said in haste and does not understand them when repeated because he assigns them good position and a good meaning. He does not understand a long angry and insulting verbal assault, because he is waiting for one more word that will give it meaning.” 

He says,  He concludes by drawing attention to two opposite powers. One is the “power in sin that has the perseverance to consume every better feeling a person has” and the other is “a heavenly power that starves the multiplicity of sin out of a person.”

Love Will Hide a Multitude of Sins 
The Epistle: 1 Peter 4:7:12
Kierkegaard says love is no dream or mood or the kind of self-love that only thinks of love in relation to itself. Kierkegaard uses the Socratic Method to question himself in relation to love and advises all to do likewise. 
Christ said to love your neighbor as yourself, which implies two commands. Kierkegaard thinks of this in relation to the title of his work. If there is this power of love that can hide my sins from God, then can I use this same power and hide my sins from my own self? Can I use this same power to hide my neighbor's sins from myself and from the rest of the world? He asks about the judgment from without, the judgment of the world, and says that it always finds what it seeks. It depends upon how it sees.  But now how does this love arise in a person's soul? This love that is able “to interpret itself to itself; make itself understandable to the single individual even if not another soul understood it”.

Kierkegaard says, “one must have the courage to will love” because “God’s love awakens crying like a newborn baby, not smiling like the child that knows its mother. But now when God’s love wants to hold fast to the Lord, the enemy rises up against one in all its terror, and the power of sin is so strong that it strikes with anxiety. But love does not shut its eyes in the hour of danger; it volunteers itself.”  Remembering is great to the understanding but love has to forget its own sins as well as the neighbor's sins, according to Kierkegaard, and this is just foolishness to the understanding.

Kierkegaard continued his discourse on love in his 1847 book, Works of Love where he said,

Strengthening in the Inner Being 
Ephesians 3:13 to the end The Bible (NIV)
I ask you, therefore, not to be discouraged because of my sufferings for you, which are your glory. For this reason I kneel before the Father, from whom his whole family in heaven and on earth derives its name. I pray that out of his glorious riches he may strengthen you with power through his Spirit in your inner being, so that Christ may dwell in your hearts through faith. And I pray that you, being rooted and established in love, may have power, together with all the saints, to grasp how wide and long and high and deep is the love of Christ, and to know this love that surpasses knowledge—that you may be filled to the measure of all the fullness of God. Now to him who is able to do immeasurably more than all we ask or imagine, according to his power that is at work within us, to him be glory in the church and in Christ Jesus throughout all generations, for ever and ever! Amen. 

Kierkegaard uses The Apostle Paul as an example in this discourse. He uses Abraham in Fear and Trembling and Job in Repetition and in Four Upbuilding Discourses. They're all examples of individuals who saw their expectancy crash but survived the shipwreck intact because they were “strengthened in the inner being.” Kierkegaard had already mentioned the category of an eternal choice in Either/Or. He said, “Already prior to one’s choosing, the personality is interested in the choice, and if one puts off the choice, the personality or the obscure forces within it unconsciously chooses. Then when a choice is eventually made-…one discovers that there is something that must be done over again, must be withdrawn, and this is often very difficult. There are stories about human beings whom mermaids or mermen have subjected to their power with their demonic music. To break the spell, so says the story, it was necessary for the person under the spell to play the same piece backward without making a single mistake. This is a very profound thought but very difficult to do, and yet this is the way it is. The error one has absorbed has to be rooted out in this way, and every time one makes a mistake one must begin all over again. As you see, this is why it is important to choose and to choose in time. I congratulate you for being still so young that even though you will always miss out on something, you nevertheless-if you have the energy or, more accurately, will to have the energy for it-can win what is the main concern of life, you can win yourself, gain yourself.” Either/Or II Hong p. 164-165

Kierkegaard discusses the “main concern of life” in this discourse.

He begins with Paul in Rome as a prisoner “with a teaching” “and the unshakable conviction that this teaching would be victorious over the whole world”. Paul was a witness, not a doubter, who “lets everything around it change and give itself up as a willing prey to life’s fickle, capricious changes, without being alarmed by such a world, without being concerned for itself.” But this concern “announces itself within the individual in such a way that he “craves an explanation, a witness that explains the meaning of everything for it, and its own meaning by explaining it in the God who holds everything together in his eternal wisdom and who assigned to man to be lord of creation by his becoming God’s servant, and explained himself to him by making him his co-worker, and through every explanation that he gives a person, he strengthens and confirms him in his inner being”. This is what strengthened Paul in prison. He didn't “run away from every explanation.” He didn't “fill time with perpetual deliberation.”   In his “concern the inner being announces itself-the inner being that is concerned not about the whole world but only about God and about itself, about the explanation that makes the relation understandable to it, and about the witness that confirms it in the relation.”  

Kierkegaard asks, 
Can prosperity serve for strengthening the inner being?
Can fortune or misfortune serve for strengthening the inner being?
Can adversity serve for strengthening the inner being?

Each single individual must decide this for himself and that depends on how one sees. "If he understood himself or tried to understand himself, if he truly was concerned about understanding himself, if the inner being announced itself within him in that concern, then he will understand prosperity, then he will understand the significance of its being denied him, then he will not occupy himself with flights of fancy and fortify himself with dreams but in his adversity will be concerned about himself."

In 1846 Kierkegaard wrote, “inwardness in erotic love does not mean to get married seven times to Danish girls, and then to go for the French and Italian, but to love one and the same and yet be continually renewed in the same erotic love, so that it continually flowers anew in mood and exuberance-which, when applied to communication, is the inexhaustible renewal and fertility of expression. Inwardness cannot be communicated directly, because expressing it directly is externality (oriented outwardly, not inwardly), and expressing inwardness directly is no proof at all that it is there (The direct outpouring of feeling is no proof at all that one has it, but the tension of the contrastive forms is the dynamometer of inwardness), and the reception intrinsic to inwardness is not a direct reproduction of what was communicated, since that is an echo. But the repetition of inwardness is the resonance in which what is said disappears, as with Mary when she hid the words in her heart.”  For Kierkegaard the outward forms of religion are meaningless without the inner dimension. He writes of, "the work of willing to hold fast to this [first] love."

Criticism 
The titles of Kierkegaard's works have undergone much change in the 100 years before they were translated into English. The Upbuilding Discourses are mentioned in an 1852 book of literature and romance under the title “Instructive Tales”. 
 "Søren Aaby Kierkegaard, "the solitary philosopher," has also probed the depths of the same metaphysic systems in the society of the great advocates of them, having especially devoted himself to the study of Schelling; and in his singular but remarkable works, "Enten—Eller"; that is, Either—Or, a Life's Fragment, by Victor the Hermit; Reiteration; "An Attempt in Experimental Psychology; Fear and Trembling; a Dialectic Lyric, by John de Silentio ; and his Instructive Tales, dedicated to that individual, has with wonderful eloquence, and with the warmth of an actual experience of the Fear and Trembling and the Gospel of Suffering of which he speaks, proclaimed his firm adhesion to that true spirit of the North, which of old saw, in the myth of Valhalla, combat and death as leading only to victory and life.The literature and romance of northern Europe: constituting a complete history of the literature of Sweden, Denmark, Norway and Iceland, with copious specimens of the most celebrated histories, romances (1852), by Howitt, William, 1792-1879; Howitt, Mary Botham, 1799-1888, joint author p. 239-240 

Another author, 90 years later, related the Discourses to Kierkegaard's other works.  Since the pseudonymous works are in the form of “indirect communication,” they stand in need of interpretation, and the Discourses, which always were in the form of “direct communication,” afford in some instances (especially in the case of Repetition, Fear and Trembling, and the Stages) a very precious and specific illumination of S.K.’s meaning, not merely a proof of his religious intent in general.
Reviewers were enthralled with Fear and Trembling and Repetition. The discourses present modes of thought that are conducive to the spiritual world where forgiveness overcomes wrath. Revenge is always sweet. Suffering is the act of loving without being affected by outward circumstances.

Influence and reception 
Kierkegaard sold 139 copies of the book.<ref>Eighteen Upbuilding Discourses Hong 1990 p. xxi-xxii</ref> Three Upbuilding Discourses was not translated into English until 1946 when David F. Swenson translated and published all the discourses in four volumes. and then Howard V. Hong translated and published them in 1990 into one volume. In 1852 these discourses were called Instructive Tales by William Howitt. Scholars relate most of Kierkegaard's work to his relationship to Regine Olsen, the Corsair affair, or his attack upon the church; all deal with his outer being. But Kierkegaard reinforced what he wrote here in his Works of Love of 1847: 

Notes

References

Sources
Eighteen Upbuilding Discourses, by Søren Kierkegaard], Princeton University Press. Hong, 1990
Fear and Trembling/Repetition; Copyright 1843 Søren Kierkegaard – Kierkegaard's Writings; 6 – copyright 1983 – Howard V. Hong
 Edifying Discourses, by Søren Kierkegaard, Vol. I, Translated from the Danish by David F. Swenson and Lillian Marvin Swenson, Augsburg Publishing House, Minneapolis, Minnesota, 1943
 Kierkegaard's Writings, III, Part I: Either/Or. Part I. Translated by Howard and Edna Hong. Princeton, 1988,   (Hong)
 Walter Lowrie, A Short Life of Kierkegaard'' Princeton University Press 1942, 1970

External links
 
 Love Will Cover a Multitude of Sins – David F. Swenson translation
 William Howitt, 

Books by Søren Kierkegaard
1843 books